Rukungiri is  a town in Rukungiri District of the Western Region of Uganda. It is the site of the district headquarters.

Location 

The coordinates of the town are 0°47'24.0"S, 29°55'30.0"E (Latitude:-0.7900; Longitude:29.9250).

Overview
Rukungiri is a two-street town surrounded by numerous hills and valleys. Most of the surrounding hills, however, have lost their natural shapes because of human activity, most notably agriculture. The town itself is located on a hilltop. In some places, the agricultural terraces on the hills cover them from the foot to peak.

Population
According to the 2002 national population census, Rukungiri had 12,765 inhabitants. In 2010, the Uganda Bureau of Statistics (UBOS) estimated the population at 14,400. In 2011, UBOS estimated the mid-year population at 14,700. In 2014, the national population census put the population at 36,509. In 2020, UBOS estimated the mid-year population of the town at 37,200 people.

Points of interest
The following additional points of interest are located in Rukungiri or near the town limits:

1. The offices of Rukungiri Town Council

2. The offices of Rukungiri District Administration

3. Rukungiri central market

4. Rukungiri Stadium

5. The  Ntungamo–Rukungiri Road ends here.

See also
 Districts of Uganda
 List of cities and towns in Uganda

References

External links
 Despite Its Rich Profile, Rukungiri Wallows In Poverty
Photo of Downtown Rukungiri

Populated places in Western Region, Uganda
Rukungiri District
Kigezi sub-region
Western Region, Uganda